Debra Lawrance (born 1 January 1957) is an Australian actress.

She is best known for her role on Home and Away, as Pippa Ross, which she played from 1990 to 1998, and has made a number of return appearances as the character, the most recent being in 2009. 

She is also known for her roles as Rose in Please Like Me, for which she won the Logie Award for Most Outstanding Supporting Actress, and Liz Conway in Neighbours. She also had roles in the cult serial Prisoner and its remake Wentworth. In 2019, she appeared in the Australian stage production of Harry Potter and the Cursed Child.

Biography

Debra Lawrance was born in Melbourne, Victoria and was the second youngest of six children. In 1974 Lawrance studied and graduated in 1976 from NIDA alongside such alumni as Mel Gibson, Steve Bisley, Judy Davis and Robert Menzies

Career

Lawrance has appeared in a number of roles including  The Sullivans as Prue Waterman (1976),  in Skyways as Sheila Turner,  A Country Practice a sKerry Burgess (1982),  Bellamy (1981) as Lisa and  Sons and Daughters between 1983 and 1984 as Lisa Cook

Lawrance had a more permanent role in Prisoner from 1985 to 1986 as Daphne Graham, after having had minor roles including as a Nurse and Trainee Prisoner Officer Sally Dean much earlier in the series.

Lawrance featured in miniseries The Last Outlaw, (1980) a series about Ned Kelly, and feature film Silver City (1984)

Lawrance's big break was a lead role in The Fast Lane, a widely successful ABC comedy. Her success led to her appearance in the film Evil Angels (released as A Cry in the Dark outside of Australia and New Zealand), starring Meryl Streep and Two Brothers Running with Tom Conti.

In July 1990 Lawrance was cast in Home and Away, taking over the role of Pippa Fletcher (later Ross) from Vanessa Downing. Lawrance left the main cast in 1998, but has made returning guest appearances over the years, the last being in 2009.

Lawrance subsequently starred in Blue Heelers in the recurring role as Reverend Grace Curtis, Tom Croydon's ill-fated wife from 2001 to 2004.

Debra's theatre credits include the London tour of Jack Davis' No Sugar, the role of Vi in the Melbourne Theatre Company production of The Memory of Water, the 2009 tour of Steel Magnolias in the role of M'lyn, the title role in the 2010 tour of Driving Miss Daisy, and in Harry Potter and the Cursed Child in 2019.

From 2013 to 2016, Lawrance played Rose, the mother of the protagonist Josh Thomas, in the comedy drama Please Like Me.

She appeared in a main role in all four seasons of the show, which saw her character deal with divorce and mental illness. Lawrance's performance was met with critical acclaim, winning her an AACTA Award for Best Performance in a Television Comedy for her part in a two-hander episode (with Thomas) in the show's second season.

In 2017, Lawrance appeared as a celebrity contestant and eventual winner in the local TV version of Hell's Kitchen.

In 2018, Lawrance read Charlotte Voake's Ginger on ABC2's Story Time.

She also joined the cast of Neighbours as Liz Conway.

Personal life
Lawrance met her husband Dennis Coard when he was cast as Pippa's second husband on Home and Away as Michael Ross. They married in 1992 and have two children, daughter Grace (born 1992) and son William (born 1999).

Filmography

Film

Television

References

External links
 

1957 births
Actresses from Melbourne
Australian film actresses
Australian soap opera actresses
Australian stage actresses
Living people
Logie Award winners
National Institute of Dramatic Art alumni
20th-century Australian actresses
21st-century Australian actresses